MyVetwork is an online community serving all members of the U.S. military — whether active duty, veteran or retired, and regardless of age or conflict — as well as their spouses, families and supporters. It was founded in 2008 by a group led by John R. Campbell, a decorated veteran Marine officer.

Objectives
Using a proprietary algorithmic process, MyVetwork provides service members and those who care about them with a means to connect with and support each other in ways that range from the lighthearted and entertaining to deep and meaningful connections.  In the process, it is building an information exchange where veterans of earlier conflicts can provide information, career advice, mentoring and other work-related resources to recently separated vets transitioning from the military experience to civilian work or education.
MyVetwork is also able to apply its profiling and matching capability to connect veterans with appropriate civilian jobs.

Heroes at Home
In 2009, MyVetwork partnered with Sears, for their Heroes at Home Campaign which raised over 6.5 million dollar in gift card donations for the Nation's military. Heroes at Home is a program Sears Holdings has created in response to an urgent need to assist military families facing hardship.

Miscellaneous
MyVetwork is a 501(c)3 not-for-profit organization and makes its community available to members at no cost.

References

External links
 USA Today about MyVetwork
 CBS2 about MyVetwork
 MyVetwork

501(c)(3) organizations
Internet properties established in 2008
American social networking websites